Schneidernematidae is a family of nematodes belonging to the order Rhabditida.

Genera:
 Ascaroterakis Vicente, 1965
 Echinomena
 Inglisonema Mawson, 1968
 Linstowinema Smales, 1997
 Madelinema Schmidt & Kuntz, 1971
 Morgascarida
 Morgascaridia Inglis, 1958
 Schneidernema Travassos, 1927

References

Nematodes